John Coffey may refer to:

People
John Coffey (historian), professor of early modern history at the University of Leicester
John Louis Coffey (1922–2012), U.S. federal judge
John Coffey (hurler) (1918–2019), Irish hurler
John B. Coffey (1921–2013), retired Lieutenant Colonel in the USAAF
John W. Coffey (born 1954), American author and art historian
Sean Coffey (John P. Coffey, born 1956), lawyer, candidate for New York Attorney General
Jack Coffey (baseball) (1887–1966), baseball infielder for Boston Doves, Detroit Tigers and Boston Red Sox
Jack Coffey (television director) (1927–2014), American television director
Jack Coffey (footballer) (1929–2007), Australian rules football player for St Kilda

Other
John Coffey, a character in the Stephen King novel The Green Mile and the subsequent film
John Coffey (band), a Dutch band

See also
John Coffee (disambiguation)

Coffey, John